The Flag's Square is the main plaza in Vlorë, Albania, dedicated to the Albanian Declaration of Independence. In its center is the Independence Monument, a sculpture worked by Albanian artist, Mumtaz Dhrami.

References

Squares in Albania
Buildings and structures in Vlorë
Tourist attractions in Vlorë County